Langthabal (Vidhan Sabha constituency) is one of the 60 Vidhan Sabha constituencies in the Indian state of Manipur.

Members of Assembly

Election results

2022

2017

See also
Manipur Legislative Assembly
List of constituencies of Manipur Legislative Assembly
 Imphal West district

References

External link
 

Assembly constituencies of Manipur
Imphal West district